Anja Obradović (born 24 January 2000) is a Serbian judoka. She won a bronze medal at the 2021 World Championships in Budapest.

During her junior career, she won a silver medal at the World Junior Championships in 2019 in Marrakech. Her older sister Jovana Bunčić is also a judoka.

She competed at the 2020 Summer Olympics in women's 63 kg event and was eliminated in the first round.

Achievements

References

External links
 

2000 births
Living people
Serbian female judoka
European Games competitors for Serbia
Judoka at the 2019 European Games
Sportspeople from Belgrade
Olympic judoka of Serbia
Judoka at the 2020 Summer Olympics